is a railway station on the AbukumaExpress in the city of Fukushima, Fukushima Prefecture, Japan.

Lines

Station layout
Mukaisenoue Station has one side platform serving a single bi-directional track. There is no station building, and the station is unattended.

Adjacent stations

History
Mukaisenoue Station opened on July 1, 1988.

Passenger statistics
In fiscal 2015, the station was used by an average of 27 passengers daily (boarding passengers only).

Surrounding area
Abukuma River

See also
 List of Railway Stations in Japan

External links

  Abukuma Express home page

References

Railway stations in Fukushima Prefecture
Abukuma Express Line
Railway stations in Japan opened in 1988
Fukushima (city)